Wolferschwenda is a village and a former municipality in the district Kyffhäuserkreis, in Thuringia, Germany. Since January 2021 it is part of the town Greußen.

References

Former municipalities in Thuringia
Kyffhäuserkreis